Acacia xerophila is a shrub of the genus Acacia and the subgenus Phyllodineae. It is native to an area in the Goldfields-Esperance region of Western Australia.

Ecology

Varieties
There are two recognised varieties:
 Acacia xerophila var. brevior
 Acacia xerophila var. xerophila

See also
List of Acacia species

References

xerophila
Acacias of Western Australia
Taxa named by William Vincent Fitzgerald